Gastrallini is a tribe of death-watch beetles in the family Ptinidae. There are at least 4 genera in Gastrallini.

Genera
These genera belong to the tribe Gastrallini:
 Falsogastrallus Pic, 1914 i c g
 Gastrallus Jacquelin du Val, 1860 i c g b
 Hemigastrallus Español et Comas, 1991
 Mimogastrallus Sakai, 2003 g
Data sources: i = ITIS, c = Catalogue of Life, g = GBIF, b = Bugguide.net

References

Further reading

External links

 

Anobiinae